Eclipse Jr. (born October 10, 1995), also known by his ring name Lanzeloth, is a Mexican Luchador enmascarado, or masked professional wrestler currently signed to Lucha Libre AAA Worldwide (AAA), where he is a former holder of the AAA World Cruiserweight Championship.  His real name is not a matter of public record, as is often the case with masked wrestlers in Mexico where their private lives are kept a secret from the wrestling fans. Eclipse Jr. is a nephew of Super Crazy, Taz El Feroz and Crazy Boy and the younger brother of Dinastía.

Championships and accomplishments
Desastre Total Ultraviolento
DTU Nexo Championship (1 time)  with Rocky Lobo
Lucha Libre AAA Worldwide
AAA World Cruiserweight Championship (1 time)

References

External links
 

1995 births
Living people
Masked wrestlers
Mexican male professional wrestlers
Professional wrestlers from Hidalgo (state)
People from Tulancingo
Unidentified wrestlers
AAA World Cruiserweight Champions
21st-century professional wrestlers